The Crestview Commercial Historic District is a U.S. historic district in Crestview, Florida. It is roughly bounded by Industrial Drive, North Ferdon Boulevard, North Wilson Street, and James Lee Boulevard. On July 20, 2006, it was added to the U.S. National Register of Historic Places.

References

Gallery

Geography of Okaloosa County, Florida
Historic districts on the National Register of Historic Places in Florida
National Register of Historic Places in Okaloosa County, Florida
2006 establishments in Florida